Barbara Minneci (born 12 June 1969, in Brussels) is a Belgian Para-Equestrian Grade II, in dressage who is well recognised for riding side saddle. She rode her horse Barilla at the 2012 Summer Paralympics and stood out due to her riding style and Barilla being a Gypsy Cob type. They did not place in the medals.

Barbara took up para-equestrian in 2009 at age 40 in Brussels, Belgium after developing cancer in 1996 and 2004 left her with monoplegia in her left leg and muscle loss in her right leg.

References 

Paralympic equestrians of Belgium
Equestrians at the 2012 Summer Paralympics
Equestrians at the 2016 Summer Paralympics
Equestrians at the 2020 Summer Paralympics
Belgian female equestrians
1969 births
Living people
Sportspeople from Brussels